Karl Johan Rasmussen (born 10 October 1973) is a Norwegian long-distance runner who specialized in marathon races. He has represented SK Vidar, Bislett FIK and Haugesund IL.

He finished eighth at the 2002 European Championships in Munich, having been in silver medal position until the last three kilometres of the race. He later competed at the 2003 World Championships, 2003 IAAF World Half Marathon Championships and 2006 European Championships without much success. He never participated in the Summer Olympics. He became Norwegian champion in 10,000 m in 1998, 2001, 2003 and 2006  and in half marathon in 1997, 1998, 2001 and 2002.

He is currently teaching social science, history and gymnastics classes at Skeisvang Videregående Skole in Haugesund, Norway.

Achievements
All results regarding marathon, unless stated otherwise

Personal bests
10,000 metres - 28:38.89 min (2002) - fifteenth among Norwegian 10,000 m runners.
Half marathon - 1:03:22 hrs (1998) - fourteenth among Norwegian half marathon runners.
Marathon - 2:14:00 hrs (2002) - thirteenth among Norwegian marathon runners.

References

1973 births
Living people
Norwegian male long-distance runners
Norwegian male marathon runners